The 2015–16 Belmont Bruins men's basketball team represented Belmont University during the 2015–16 NCAA Division I men's basketball season. The Bruins, led by 30th year head coach Rick Byrd, played their home games at the Curb Event Center and were members of the Ohio Valley Conference in the East Division. They finished the season 20–12, 12–4 in OVC play to be champions of the East Division and overall OVC regular season champions. They lost in the semifinals of the OVC tournament to Austin Peay. As a regular season conference champion who failed to win their conference tournament, they received an automatic bid to the National Invitation Tournament where they lost in the first round to Georgia.

Roster

Schedule

|-
!colspan=9 style=| Non-conference regular season

|-
!colspan=9 style=| Ohio Valley Conference regular season

|-
!colspan=9 style=| Ohio Valley Conference tournament

|-
!colspan=9 style=| National Invitation tournament

References

Belmont Bruins men's basketball seasons
Belmont
Belmont